CHWDP or HWDP  is a frequently used Polish acronym or initialism of the Polish phrase chuj w dupę policji, literally meaning "(put a) dick in the police's ass." This anti-authoritarian and anti-police  slogan, often written on walls in Poland, is used as a vulgar form of provocation against the police and authorities. The initialism was largely popularised by Polish hip hop music and Polish anarchists, where it is often used in lyrics and as graffiti. It is a specific expression of protest against the authorities, and against "the system" in general. It is more or less analogous to the English language expressions ACAB and “fuck the police”.

In Polish orthography, Ch is a digraph. However as chuj is pronounced the same as huj, the acronym HWDP is commonly seen.

Popularity

The slogan is already very widespread in Poland, and its popularity is spreading to other countries, most notably Slovakia and Germany. The popularity of this slogan is rapidly growing.

Alternate expansions

One of the ways in which the popularity of the initialism is easily noticed is that it was given many alternative expansions. Still, the basic meaning is generally known. Others are merely jokes that are sometimes used to avoid awkward situations and to relieve the tension, e.g. when people who propagate this abbreviation talk with the police or by the policemen who want to avoid embarrassment when they are asked to expand the abbreviation during interviews.

Spread on the Internet
However, the popularity of this initialism is not limited to it being spraypainted on the walls in Poland. In fact, the initialism has also spread among the Internet users, both Polish and foreign.

See also
 ACAB

References

External links
 
 

Graffiti and unauthorised signage
Law enforcement in Poland
Profanity
Youth culture in Poland
Protests against police brutality